Yemen Arabian Sea Ports Corporation (YASPC) is a sovereign government corporation that supervises the management of Yemeni ports in the Arabian Sea, mainly Port of Mukalla in Hadramawt, Port of Socotra, and Port of Nashtoon in al-Mahara. The YASPC was established on 28 April 2007 as part of the Ministry of Transport.

See also 

 Yemen Gulf of Aden Ports Corporation
 Yemen Red Sea Ports Corporation
 Dhabba Oil Terminal
 Port of Aden

References

External links 

Government of Yemen
Transport in Yemen
Ports and harbours of Yemen
2007 establishments in Yemen